The following is a timeline of the history of the city of Brescia in the Lombardy region of Italy.

Prior to 15th century

 350 BCE – Celtic Cenomani take  from the Etruscans (approximate date).
 225 BCE – Gallic Cenomani Brixia allies with Rome.
 89 BCE – Brixia "granted Latin citizenship."
 49 BCE – Brixia granted "Roman citizenship."
 7 CE – Brixia becomes part of the Regio X Venetia et Histria.
 73 CE – Capitolium of Brixia built.
 320 CE – Roman Catholic Diocese of Brescia established (approximate date).
 387 – Gaudentius of Brescia becomes bishop.
 452 – Brescia sacked by forces of Attila.
 562 – Lombards in power.
 753 – San Salvatore monastery founded.
 756 – Desiderius in power.
 1100 - Old Cathedral, Brescia construction begins.
 1135-1138 –  The commune of Brescia revolts against the Bishop Manfred.
1139 - Bishop Manfred, having received Pope Innocent II's support, has Arnold of Brescia exiled.
 1167 – Brescia active member of the Lombard League.
 1222 – 25 December: 1222 Brescia earthquake.
 1235 – Broletto palace built.
 1238 – Attempted siege by forces of Frederick II, Holy Roman Emperor.
 1258 – Scaligeri in power.
 1266 – Charles of Anjou in power.
 1339 – Visconti in power.

15th–19th centuries
 1421 - Visconti of Milan in power.
 1426 – Venetians in power.
 1473 – Printing press in operation.
 1478 – Plague.
 1487 – Santa Maria dei Miracoli church construction begins.
 1512 – 19 February: Sack of Brescia by French forces during the War of the League of Cambrai.(it)
 1563 – Accademia degli Occulti founded.
 1574
 Palazzo della Loggia completed.
 Guazzo's Civil Conversazione (etiquette book) published in Brescia.
 1604 – New Cathedral construction begins.
 1745 – Biblioteca Queriniana (library) founded.
 1769 – 18 August: Lightning causes explosion.
 1797
 Venetian rule ends; Brescia becomes part of the French client Cisalpine Republic.
 Broletto palace destroyed by French forces.
 1805 – Brescia becomes part of the Napoleonic Kingdom of Italy.
 1813 – Monumental cemetery of Brescia established.
 1814 – Austrians in power.
 1848 – March: Political unrest.
 1849 – Uprising against Austrian rule; crackdown.
 1850 – August: Flood.
 1854 - Brescia railway station opened.
 1859
 June: Garibaldi and the Cacciatori delle Alpi military unit enter city.
 Brescia becomes part of the Kingdom of Sardinia.
 Provincial  (district) established.
 1875 – Dismantling of city walls begins.
 1882 –  begins operating.
 1888 – Banca San Paolo di Brescia (bank) established.
 1897 – Population: 67,923.

20th century

 1901 - Population: 72,731.
 1909 – Aerodrome built.
 1911 – Population: 83,338.
 1913 - Zoo of Brescia Castle opened.
 1919 - Brescia University College opened as Ursuline College.
 1925
  publisher in business.
 Brescia University established.
 1927 – Mille Miglia car race begins.
 1932 –  remodelled.
 1936 –  begins operating.
 1944 – Bombing of Brescia in World War II.
 1945
 Bombing.
 Giornale di Brescia newspaper begins publication.
 1948 –  becomes mayor (until 1975).
 1974
 28 May: Piazza della Loggia bombing.
 Bresciaoggi Nuovo newspaper begins publication.
 1982 – University of Brescia established.
 1988 - Zoo of Brescia Castle closed.
 1992 – Paolo Corsini becomes mayor.
 1999 –  (museum) established.

21st century

 2013
  held; Emilio Del Bono becomes mayor.
 Population: 188,520.

See also
 
 List of mayors of Brescia
 List of bishops of Brescia
 , 1861–present
 Timeline of the Republic of Venice, of which Brescia was part 1426-1797
 History of Lombardy (it)

Timelines of other cities in the macroregion of Northwest Italy:(it)
 Liguria region: Timeline of Genoa
 Lombardy region: Timeline of Bergamo; Cremona; Mantua; Milan; Pavia
 Piedmont region: Timeline of Novara; Turin

References

This article incorporates information from the Italian Wikipedia.

Bibliography

in English
 
 
 
 
 
 
  (+ 1870 ed.)

in Italian
  1839–1843 (5 volumes)
  1853–1865 (11 volumes)
 
 
 * 
 
 
  1963–1964
 Antonio Fappani. Brescia in Enciclopedia bresciana, Editrice Voce del Popolo, Brescia, 1975.
 
 Gino Bambara and Giuseppe Pea. Bombardamenti su Brescia, 1944–1945. Mostra fotografica (Brescia: Associazione Culturale Neo Umanesimo, 1996)
Gianluigi Valotti, Il ricordo dei Prodi bresciani e dei Caduti del 1859 nel Cimitero Vantiniano di Brescia, Bornato, Sardini Editrice, 2016, 
Gianluigi Valotti, Brescia 1859. Il Vantiniano accoglie le spoglie delle armate europee, Brescia, Fondazione Negri, 2017. Brescia 1849. I caduti delle dieci giornate di Gianluigi Valotti - La Compagnia della Stampa - 2018:

External links

  (city archives)
 Archivio di Stato di Brescia (state archives)
 Items related to Brescia, various dates (via Europeana)
 Items related to Brescia, various dates (via Digital Public Library of America)

Brescia
Brescia
brescia